Atherosperma moschatum subsp. integrifolium is a small evergreen tree native to the temperate rainforests of central and northern New South Wales, Australia. In 2006, it was recognised as a separate subspecies by Richard Schodde. Common names include "southern sassafras - narrow leaf form" and "blackheart sassafras".

Description
The southern sassafras is a shrub or a small tree, growing from 1 to 30 m tall. The trunk is not buttressed and somewhat cylindrical. The bark is fairly smooth with bumps and lenticels, often also marked with moss and lichen. Young shoots and new growth are noticeably hairy. It is a scented and beautiful tree, especially when in flower.

Its leaves are narrower than the more southern form of A. m. subsp. moschatum, and many of the leaves are entire, though some small prickles grow on a minority of leaves. Leaves are opposite on the stem, 8 cm long, 1 cm wide, white underneath, glossy above, and veiny. They are pleasantly scented when crushed.

Flowers form in winter, facing down to avoid rain and snow. Petals are white, and yellow and maroon in the centre. The fruit capsules mature and open around January, releasing feathery wind-blown seeds. Germination is unreliable. However, abundant new seedlings may unexpectedly form. Seedlings are unlikely to survive at lower altitudes.

Habitat 
Its habitat is cool, moist, protected areas, ranging from 650 to 1540 m above sea level, near streams. Almost always it is seen growing with the black olive berry. Often found on the richer volcanic soils, it also grows in sandstone slot canyons where it may be in a dwarf form. An uncommon or rare plant, it may be seen at the Mount Tomah Botanic Garden west of Sydney, or on the Neates Glen walk at Blackheath.

Distribution 
It is found in four areas: Monga National Park, Blue Mountains, Barrington Tops, and at Mount Grundy west of Port Macquarie, by streams such as the Tia River. It may also be undiscovered in the Illawarra to the south, and New England National Park to the north. The original specimen was collected in the Blue Mountains.

Historical uses
The 1889 book 'The Useful Native Plants of Australia records that "The fragrant bark of this tree has been used as tea in Tasmania. A decoction or infusion of the green or dried bark was made, and according to Mr. Gunn, it has a pleasant taste when taken with plenty of milk. Its effect is, however, slightly aperient. It is also used in the form of a beer. The bark contains an agreeable bitter, of much repute as a tonic amongst sawyers. It is called Native Sassafras from the odour of its bark, due to an essential oil closely resembling true sassafras in odour. Bosisto likens the smell of the inner bark to new ale, and says that a decoction from this part of the tree is a good substitute for yeast in raising bread. It is diaphoretic and diuretic in asthma and other pulmonary affections, but it is known more especially for its sedative action on the heart, and it has been successfully used in some forms of heart disease. It is prepared of the strength of 4 ounces of the bark to 20
ounces of rectified spirit, and is given in doses of 30 to 60 drops, usually on a lump of sugar. The volatile oil of the bark alone is said to have a lowering action on the heart. See "Volatile and Essential Oils." The bark has been examined by N. Zeyer, who has found in it volatile oil, fixed oil, wax, albumin, gum, sugar, starch, butyric acid, an aromatic resin, iron-greening tannic acid, and an alkaloid which he designates atherospermine. ."

Genetic study 
Genetic studies of the subspecies, along with the more widespread southerly distributed subspecies, Atherosperma moschatum subsp. moschatum, have shown that populations of the subspecies A. m. integrifolium are the most strongly diverged of all populations within the range of the species at both isozymes and chloroplast DNA. These results are consistent with long-term isolation of these populations through at least the last glacial period.

References

Atherospermataceae
Laurales of Australia
Trees of Australia
Flora of New South Wales
Plant subspecies